Château Montrose is a winery in the Saint-Estèphe appellation of the Bordeaux region of France. The wine produced here was classified as one of fourteen Deuxièmes Crus (Second Growths) in the original Bordeaux Wine Official Classification of 1855.

Location

The vineyard is in Saint-Estèphe, the northernmost of the great Médoc communes.  The soil in Montrose's  consists of gravel and black sand with a subsoil of clay and marl.  They are planted with 65% Cabernet Sauvignon, 25% Merlot and 10% Cabernet Franc.

The wine

Château Montrose produces three red wines: its eponymous grand vin, a second wine named La Dame de Montrose and a third, more modestly priced wine named Tertio de Montrose. The 1970 vintage was placed third among the ten California and French red wines at the historic Judgment of Paris wine competition, which was won by the Americans.

Montrose wines tend to be deeply tannic and during excellent vintages can take up to 20 years to mature.

The 1990, 2009 and 2010 vintages were rated 100 points by Robert M. Parker, Jr.

References

External links

Château Montrose official web site

Bordeaux wine producers